These are the official results of the Women's Heptathlon competition at the 2001 World Championships in Edmonton, Alberta, Canada. With 18 participating athletes, including two non-finishers and one non-starter, the competition is notable for having the lowest number of competitors in the World Championships history. The competition started on Saturday August 4, 2001 and ended on Sunday August 5, 2001.

Medalists

Schedule

Saturday, August 4

Sunday, August 5

Records

Results

References
 Results
 IAAF

D
Heptathlon at the World Athletics Championships
2001 in women's athletics